The following is a list of characters featured in The Saga of Shadows, a forthcoming trilogy of science fiction novels written by Kevin J. Anderson. The first novel, The Dark Between the Stars, was released by Tor Books on June 3, 2014.

For characters from Anderson's preceding novel series The Saga of Seven Suns (2002-2008), see List of The Saga of Seven Suns characters.

Humans

Confederation
In the series, the human race has colonized multiple planets in the Spiral Arm. Since the dissolution of the corrupt Terran Hanseatic League, human civilization is allied under the Confederation, currently ruled by King Peter and Queen Estarra of Theroc. This planet's "green priests" are able to commune with the semi-sentient worldtrees and communicate telepathically across space when touching a treeling, making them indispensable for instantaneous communication across the galaxy.

Roamers
In the series, the Roamers are clans of industrious humans once living a clandestine existence in the fringes of space, but now allied with planet-bound colonies under the Confederation. Managing a profitable economy centered on the sale of the valuable stardrive fuel ekti and other commodities, the Roamers are still adjusting to their new place in the Confederation while trying to maintain their independence and historical culture.

Ildirans
In the series, the Ildiran Empire has existed for over ten thousand years, living peacefully due to a communal mental interconnectedness called the thism. Each Ildiran has what is called a soulthread, and these soulthreads are woven together by their leader, the Mage-Imperator. Ildirans have a very specialized society, with specific castes that are adept at performing particular tasks. The castes are physically different from one another, and have different suffixes at the end of their names. Ildirans are the first extraterrestrials that humanity encounters upon exploring space beyond Earth, and the Ildirans share their stardrive technology with humans.

Artificial intelligence

References

 
Lists of fictional characters